Rear Admiral Louise Currie Wilmot (born December 31, 1942) is a retired United States Navy officer who was the first woman to command a United States Naval base. When she retired after 30 years of service, she was the highest ranking female naval officer in the United States.

Early life
Raised in Wayne, New Jersey, Wilmot attended Wayne Valley High School and earned a degree in history from the College of Saint Elizabeth in Morris Township, New Jersey in 1964.

Navy career
 Commanding Officer, Navy Recruiting District, Omaha (1979–)
 Commander of the Navy Recruiting Area Five in Great Lakes, Michigan (1985–)
 Executive Assistant and Naval Aide to the Assistant Secretary of the Navy for Manpower and Reserve Affairs
 Vice Chief of Naval Education and Training in Pensacola, Florida
 Commander of the Naval Training Center in Orlando, Florida (1989–)
 Commanding Officer, Naval Base Philadelphia (1993–1994)

Wilmot retired in 1994. She was the highest ranking female Naval officer at that time.

Awards and decorations
Wilmot's decorations include the Navy Distinguished Service Medal, the Defense Superior Service Medal, the Legion of Merit (with three gold stars), the Meritorious Service Medal, and the Joint Services Commendation Medal.

Education
Wilmot earned a master's degree from George Washington University in 1978 and was recognized with the GW Alumni Association's Distinguished Alumni Award in 1994.

Post-navy career
Following retirement Wilmot joined Catholic Relief Services as deputy executive director of public outreach.

Wilmot's personal papers are kept by the Special Collections and Archives Department of the United States Naval Academy.

See also
Women in the United States Navy

References

Further reading

External links
Louise C. Wilmot Papers, 1918; 1964-1999 MS 414 held by Special Collections & Archives, Nimitz Library at the United States Naval Academy
 

Living people
United States Navy rear admirals
Female admirals of the United States Navy
Saint Elizabeth University alumni
People from Wayne, New Jersey
Recipients of the Navy Distinguished Service Medal
Recipients of the Legion of Merit
Recipients of the Defense Superior Service Medal
1942 births
21st-century American women
Military personnel from New Jersey